The Farscape Roleplaying Game is a role-playing game based on the television series, Farscape, published by Alderac Entertainment Group.  Besides featuring characters and planets from the show, the game added a few more not seen onscreen. There was also an original story entitled "Ten Little Aliens," written by Keith R.A. DeCandido, who wrote the Farscape novel House of Cards.

History
The Farscape RPG (2002), a d20-based game focused on the sci-fi TV show, was the first d20-based RPG from Alderac Entertainment Group. The Farscape game never got any support, and the show was cancelled not long after.

Reception
The game was nominated for ENnie awards for Best Graphic Design and Layout and Best d20 Game in 2003.

Reviews
Pyramid

References

External links
Official site at Alderac Entertainment Group

Alderac Entertainment Group games
D20 System
Role-playing games based on television series
Role-playing games introduced in 2002
Space opera role-playing games